The France women's national basketball team represents France in international women's basketball and is administered by the French Federation of Basketball. The team is nicknamed Les Bleues {The Blues}. However, after their unexpected triumph at the 2009 EuroBasket the team earned the name Les Braqueuses (The Robbers) due their spectacular play. France is the leading nation in terms of EuroBasket Women qualifications. (Alongside Italy)

Competitive record

Team

Current roster
Roster for the 2022 FIBA Women's Basketball World Cup.

Notable players
 Nicole Antibe
 Isabelle Fijalkowski
 Jacky Chazalon
 Céline Dumerc
 Christine Gomis
 Irène Guidotti
 Marine Johannès
 Edwige Lawson
 Catherine Melain
 Lætitia Moussard
 Élisabeth Riffiod
 Odile Santaniello
 Laure Savasta
 Yannick Souvré

Successive coaches
 Alain Jardel
 Jacques Commères
 Pierre Vincent

Media coverage
France's matches are currently broadcast by Canal+.

See also
 France women's national under-20 basketball team
 France women's national under-19 basketball team
 France women's national under-17 basketball team
 France women's national 3x3 team

References

External links

FIBA profile
France National Team – Women at Eurobasket.com

 
Women's national basketball teams